Once Bitten is a 1985 American teen horror comedy film, starring Lauren Hutton, Jim Carrey, and Karen Kopins. Carrey has his first major lead role playing Mark Kendall, an innocent and naïve high school student who is seduced in a Hollywood nightclub by a sultry blonde countess (Hutton), who unknown to him is a centuries-old vampire. While the movie underperformed at the box office, it has since become a cult classic.

Plot
Being 400 years old, the Countess has collected a stable of young men and women who accompany her on her centuries-old journey through eternal life and youth. Though she is immortal, she is required to drink the blood of a young male virgin three times by Halloween each year to keep her immortality and youthful appearance. She finds this task increasingly and extremely hard, since attractive young male virgins are almost impossible to find in the 1980s, particularly in hedonistic cities, in this case, Los Angeles, California.

Meanwhile, virgin high school student Mark Kendall wants to have sex, but is being put off by his girlfriend Robin Pierce. One night, Mark and his best friends Jamie and Russ go into a singles bar in Hollywood. Mark meets the Countess, goes back to her mansion and after she seduces him, passes out when she bites his thigh. When he wakes up, she pretends they have had sex and tells him that he is now hers. Mark does not know what she means and, over the next few days, begins showing strange behaviors: having strange dreams, avoiding direct sunlight, and even drinking blood (from raw meat). After the Countess gets a second bite, Robin notices Mark's odd behavior and confronts the Countess during a dance-off at the high school's Halloween dance.

While it appears that Robin has won back Mark, this is only temporary. The Countess kidnaps Robin to lure Mark to her mansion for a final bite before her deadline expires, and it is up to Robin, Jamie, and Russ to stop her. Eventually, to save Mark from the Countess's clutches, Robin and Mark have sex in a coffin while being chased by the Countess's minions, thereby taking Mark's virginity, bringing him back to normal. This renders him useless to the Countess as she has to drink virgin blood. Defeated, the Countess then begins to grow old and decrepit before their eyes. The Countess's assistant, Sebastian, tells her not to worry as there are other virgins in the world despite the fact that the Countess doubts she will find another virgin. The movie ends with Mark and Robin continuing to have sex in the coffin.

Cast
 Lauren Hutton as the Countess
 Jim Carrey as Mark Kendall
 Karen Kopins as Robin Pierce
 Cleavon Little as Sebastian, the Countess's manservant 
 Thomas Ballatore as Jamie
 Skip Lackey as Russ
 Richard Schaal as Mr. Kendall, Mark's father
 Peggy Pope as Mrs. Kendall, Mark's mother
 Megan Mullally as Suzette

The Countess's Vampires 
 Jeb Stuart Adams as World War I Ace Vampire
 Stuart Charno as Cabin Boy Vampire
 Robin Klein as 1960s Flower Child Vampire
 Carey More as Moll Flanders Vampire
 Glen Mauro as Twin Vampire #1
 Gary Mauro as Twin Vampire #2

Release
The film was released on November 15, 1985 on 1,095 screens, and opened at number one at the U.S. box office, grossing $4,025,657 for the weekend. It eventually earned around $10 million in the United States and Canada.

Critical reception
Once Bitten received polarizing response from critics; on review aggregator Rotten Tomatoes, the film holds an approval rating of 10% based on 10 reviews, with an average score of 3.3/10. On Metacritic, the film received a score of 64 based on 4 reviews, indicating "generally favorable reviews".

Janet Maslin of The New York Times wrote that it "has a lot more stylishness than wit." Kevin Thomas of the Los Angeles Times called it an "extreme rarity" for its subtle and hilarious sexual humor in a teen film. Rita Kempley of The Washington Post described it as "a sappy, sophomoric sex farce" that uses dated humor.

Home media

The film was first released on VHS in 1986 and on DVD on August 26, 2003. Scream Factory released the film on Blu-Ray on February 10, 2015.

See also
Vampire film

References

External links
 
 
 

1985 films
1985 comedy films
1985 directorial debut films
1985 independent films
1980s comedy horror films
1980s fantasy comedy films
1980s sex comedy films
1980s teen comedy films
American comedy horror films
American fantasy comedy films
American independent films
American sex comedy films 
American teen comedy films
1980s English-language films
Films about virginity
Films scored by John Du Prez
Films set in Los Angeles
Films shot in Los Angeles
Films with screenplays by Jonathan Roberts (writer)
The Samuel Goldwyn Company films
American vampire films
Vampire comedy films
1980s American films